The 2016 Internationaux de Strasbourg was a professional tennis tournament played on clay courts. It was the 30th edition of the tournament and part of the International-level tournament category of the 2016 WTA Tour. It took place in Strasbourg, France, on 15–21 May 2015.

Points and prize money

Point distribution

Prize money

Singles main draw entrants

Seeds 

 1 Rankings as of May 9, 2016.

Other entrants 
The following players received wildcards into the singles main draw:
  Sara Errani
  Kristina Mladenovic
  Pauline Parmentier

The following players received entry from the qualifying draw:
  Lauren Davis
  Alla Kudryavtseva
  Alizé Lim
  Mirjana Lučić-Baroni
  Jil Belen Teichmann
  Xu Yifan

The following player received entry as lucky losers:
  Virginie Razzano
  Shelby Rogers

Withdrawals 
Before the tournament
  Daria Gavrilova → replaced by  Olga Govortsova
  Camila Giorgi → replaced by  Shelby Rogers
  Danka Kovinić → replaced by  Kurumi Nara
  Monica Niculescu → replaced by  Virginie Razzano
  Magdaléna Rybáriková → replaced by  Elena Vesnina
  Anna Karolína Schmiedlová → replaced by  Donna Vekić
  Yanina Wickmayer → replaced by  Zarina Diyas
  Caroline Wozniacki → replaced by  Hsieh Su-wei

During the tournament
  Samantha Stosur (left wrist injury)

Doubles main draw entrants

Seeds 

1 Rankings as of May 9, 2016.

Other entrants 
The following pair received entry as alternates:
  Ema Burgić Bucko /  Victoria Muntean

Withdrawals 
Before the tournament
  Kateryna Bondarenko (viral illness)

Champions

Singles 

  Caroline Garcia def.  Mirjana Lučić-Baroni, 6–4, 6–1

Doubles 

  /  Arantxa Parra Santonja  def.  María Irigoyen /  Liang Chen, 6–2, 6–0

External links 
 Official website

2016 WTA Tour
2016
2016 in French tennis
May 2016 sports events in France